Sitaram Yechury (born 12 August 1952) is an Indian marxist politician and the General Secretary of the Communist Party of India (Marxist), the largest communist party in India. He is also a member of the Politburo of the CPI(M),

Early life
Sitaram Yechury was born on 12 August 1952 in an Andhra Telugu-speaking family of Madras (Chennai). His father Sarveswara Somayajula Yechury was an engineer in the Andhra Pradesh State Road Transport Corporation. His mother Kalpakam Yechury was a government officer. He grew up in Hyderabad and studied at All Saints High School, Hyderabad till his tenth standard. The Telangana agitation of 1969 brought him to Delhi. He joined Presidents Estate School, New Delhi and achieved the All-India first rank in the Central Board of Secondary Education Higher Secondary Examination. Subsequently, he studied B.A. (Hons.) in Economics at the St. Stephen's College, Delhi  and M.A. in Economics, from Jawaharlal Nehru University  (JNU), achieving first class in both. He joined the JNU for a Ph.D. in Economics, which was aborted with his arrest during The Emergency.

Political career
Yechury joined the Students' Federation of India (SFI) in 1974. A year later, he joined the Communist Party of India (Marxist).

Yechury was arrested in 1975 during the Emergency while he was still a student at JNU. He went underground for some time, organising resistance to the Emergency, before his arrest. After the Emergency, he was elected as the President of the JNU Students' Union thrice during one year (1977–78). Yechury, along with Prakash Karat, was instrumental in creating an impregnable leftist bastion at JNU.

In 1978, Yechury was elected as All-India Joint Secretary of SFI, and went on to become the All India President of SFI. He was the first president of SFI who was not from Kerala or Bengal. In 1984, he was elected to the Central Committee of the CPI(M). In 1985, the party constitution was modified and a five-man central secretariat was elected, consisting of younger stalwarts - him, Prakash Karat, Sunil Moitra, P. Ramachandran and S. Ramachandran Pillai - to work under the direction and control of the politburo. He left the SFI in 1986. He was then elected to the Politburo at the Fourteenth Congress in 1992 and as the fifth General Secretary of CPI(M) at the party's 21st party Congress in Visakhapatnam on 19 April 2015. He and politburo member S. Ramachandran Pillai were the frontrunners for the post but the former was unanimously chosen after Pillai chose to withdraw. He succeeded Prakash Karat, who had held the post for three consecutive terms, from 2005 to 2015. He was again re-elected as General Secretary of CPI(M) at the 22nd Party Congress held at Hyderabad during 18 April 2018 to 22 April 2018..He was elected for a third and his final term as General Secretary of CPI(M) at the 23rd Party Congress held at Kannur, Kerala during April 6 2022 to April 10 2022.

Yechury is considered to uphold the coalition-building legacy of former general secretary Harkishan Singh Surjeet. He worked with P. Chidambaram to draft the common minimum programme for the United Front government in 1996 and had actively pursued the coalition-building process during the formation of the United Progressive Alliance government in 2004.

Yechury has headed the party's international department and the party used to depute him as fraternal delegate to the party conferences of most socialist countries. A prolific writer, he has authored many books and writes the fortnightly column Left Hand Drive for Hindustan Times, a widely circulated daily. He has edited party's fortnightly newspaper People's Democracy for the past 20 years.

Role in Rajya Sabha
Yechury was elected to Rajya Sabha from West Bengal in July 2005. He is known for bringing several popular issues to the notice of parliament and for raising questions on important issues. On blaming by the ruling party for frequent disruptions in parliament, he said that government cannot escape from its responsibility by blaming the opposition for frequent disruptions. He justifies disruptions in parliament by calling it a legitimate process in a democracy.

During the negotiations for the Indo-US Nuclear Pact, Yechury listed in the Rajya Sabha all the conditions that the CPM required of the agreement. After the Manmohan Singh government satisfied all the conditions, he was overruled by Prakash Karat, who claimed that the agreement still violated the CPM's idea of "independent foreign policy". It is said that this left Yechury "displeased and helpless".

On 3 March 2015 during parliament session, Yechury moved an amendment to President Pranab Mukherjee's address on the inaugural day of Parliament's budget session, which was passed by division of votes in Rajya Sabha which brought huge embarrassment to the Modi government. Parliamentary affairs minister Venkaiah Naidu stated that Yechury's concern had been noted and requested him to not go ahead with the amendment as this was not a convention. Yechury said normally he would accept such a request, but he was pressing for the amendment as the government left no choice as even after 14 hours of debate, opposition was denied opportunity to seek clarification on the Prime Minister's reply. This was the fourth time in Rajya Sabha's history that an amendment moved by the opposition to the motion of thanks to the President's address had been passed.

Views on United States
Yechury is a staunch critic of US foreign policy. He also criticised the visit of the US president Barack Obama on Republic Day.

While blaming the US for rise of Islamic fundamentalism he said, "US military interventions in West Asia have created a situation of complete uncertainty. The military interventions have always given birth to the rise of fundamentalism, which we see today in the menace that has been created by the ISIS. They have given birth to such tendencies."

He also blames the US for its hegemonic attitude, he said "Now, in their (US) quest for global hegemony, they are trying to capture the energy resources in the world. They are trying to control the entire process of the energy transfers or trade in the world. And for this reason, their military interventions has also continuing to deny the Palestinians their legitimate right to a homeland." He was also a staunch critic of abrogation of article 370 and 35A in Jammu and Kashmir.

Personal life
Yechury is married to journalist Seema Chisti, who is the editor of The Wire, and formerly the Delhi editor of BBC Hindi Service. She was the Resident Editor of Indian Express, Delhi. Yechury said in a ScoopWhoop episode that his wife financially sustains him. He was married before, to Indrani Mazumdar, daughter of Vina Mazumdar, and has a daughter and a son from this marriage. His daughter, Akhila Yechury, is a major in history and teaches at the University of Edinburgh and University of St. Andrews. Mohan Kanda IAS, former Chief Secretary of Andhra Pradesh, is Yechury's maternal uncle.

His son Ashish Yechury died on 22 April 2021 due to COVID-19, he was 34.

On 12 September 2020, he along with Yogendra Yadav and others was named in the supplementary chargesheet  by Delhi Police for their alleged role in 2020 Delhi riots over which Yechury responded that BJP was misusing its power to target the opposition.

Books
Yechury has authored the following books: 
 What is This Hindu Rashtra?: On Golwalkar's Fascistic Ideology and the Saffron Brigade's Practice (Frontline Publications, Hyderabad, 1993)
 Pseudo Hinduism Exposed: Saffron Brigade's Myths and Reality (Communist Party of India (Marxist), New Delhi, 1993)
 Caste and Class in Indian Politics Today (Prajasakti Book House, Hyderabad, 1997)
 Oil Pool Deficit Or Cesspool of Deceit  (Communist Party of India (Marxist), New Delhi, 1997)
 Socialism in a Changing World (Prajasakti Book House, Hyderabad, 2008)
 Left Hand Drive: Concrete Analysis of Concrete Conditions (Prajasakti Book House, Hyderabad, 2012)
 Modi Government: New Surge of Communalism (Prajasakti Book House, Hyderabad, 2014)
 Communalism vs. Secularism
 Ghrina Ki Rajniti (Vani Prakashan, New Delhi, 2006) (in Hindi)
 
Yechury has edited the following books: 
 People's Diary of Freedom Struggle (Communist Party of India (Marxist), New Delhi, 2008)
 The Great Revolt A Left Appraisal (Communist Party of India (Marxist), New Delhi)
 Global Economic Crisis: A Marxist Perspective

References

External links

 Yechury's column in Hindustan Times

1952 births
Telugu people
Living people
St. Stephen's College, Delhi alumni
Communist Party of India (Marxist) politicians
Trade unionists from Tamil Nadu
Indian political writers
Jawaharlal Nehru University alumni
Indian Marxist journalists
Indian Marxist writers
Politicians from Chennai
Delhi University alumni
Rajya Sabha members from West Bengal
General Secretaries of the Communist Party of India (Marxist)
Indian male journalists
20th-century Indian non-fiction writers
21st-century Indian non-fiction writers
Journalists from Tamil Nadu
Anti-Americanism
Jawaharlal Nehru University Students' Union
Communist Party of India (Marxist) politicians from Andhra Pradesh
Students' Federation of India All India Presidents
Alumni of All Saints High School, Hyderabad